Karpin  is a settlement in the administrative district of Gmina Police, within Police County, West Pomeranian Voivodeship, in north-western Poland, close to the German border.

History 
For the history of the region, see History of Pomerania.

Below is a time line showing the history of the different administrations within which this city has been included.

Political-administrative membership
  1815–1866: German Confederation, Kingdom of Prussia, Pomerania
 1866–1871: North German Confederation, Kingdom of Prussia, Pomerania
  1871–1918: German Empire, Kingdom of Prussia, Pomerania
  1919–1933: Weimarer Republik, Free State of Prussia, Pomerania
  1933–1945: Nazi Germany, Pomerania
  1945–1952: People's Republic of Poland, Szczecin Voivodeship
  1952–1975: People's Republic of Poland, Szczecin Voivodeship
  1975–1989: People's Republic of Poland, Szczecin Voivodeship
  1989–1998: Poland, Szczecin Voivodeship
  1999–Current: Poland, Western Pomerania, powiat Police County, gmina Police

Demography
 The village has a population:
 1773 – 57
 1939 – 112
 1972 – 20
 1998 – 5
 2000 – 4

References

Karpin